Matthias Keller (born 20 November 1974 in Schweinfurt) is a German retired footballer.

He was a member of the team that won promotion to the 2. Bundesliga as well as promotion to the Bundesliga. Since the end of the 2007–08 season, Keller played for Hoffenheim's reserve team until 2009. He has a wife, Sonja, and one daughter.

References

External links
 

German footballers
1974 births
Living people
1. FC Kaiserslautern II players
1. FC Kaiserslautern players
SV Meppen players
SV Eintracht Trier 05 players
TSG 1899 Hoffenheim players
2. Bundesliga players
Association football midfielders
People from Schweinfurt
Sportspeople from Lower Franconia
Footballers from Bavaria